Philip(p) I may refer to:

 Philip I of Macedon (7th century BC)
 Philip I Philadelphus (between 124 and 109 BC–83 or 75 BC)
 Philip the Arab (c. 204–249), Roman Emperor
 Philip I of France (1052–1108)
 Philip I (archbishop of Cologne) (1130–1191)
 Philip I, Count of Flanders (1143–1191)
 Philip I of Namur, (1175–1212)
 Philip I, Count of Boulogne (1200–1235)
 Philip I, Count of Savoy (1207–1285)
 Philip I, Latin Emperor (1243–1283)
 Philip IV of France, aka Philip I of Navarre (1268–1314)
 Philip I of Piedmont, known as Philip of Savoy (1278–1334) lord of Piedmont
 Philip I, Prince of Taranto (1278–1331/2)
 Philip I, Count of Auvergne (1323–1346)
 Philip I, Duke of Burgundy (1346–1361)
 Philipp I, Count of Nassau-Weilburg (1368–1429)
 Philip I, Metropolitan of Moscow (died 1473)
 Philipp I, Count of Katzenelnbogen (1402–1479)
 Philip I, Duke of Brabant (1404–1430)
 Philipp I, Count of Hanau-Lichtenberg (1417–1480)
 Philip I de Croÿ, Count of Porcéan  (1435–1511)
 Philip I, Count of Waldeck (1445–1475)
 Philipp I, Count of Hanau-Münzenberg (1449–1500)
 Philip I, Duke of Brunswick-Grubenhagen (1476–1551)
 Philip I of Castile, Philip the Handsome (1478–1506)
 Philip I, Margrave of Baden (1479-1533)
 Philip I, Count of Nassau-Wiesbaden-Idstein (1490–1558)
 Philip I, Landgrave of Hesse (1504–1567)
 Philip I, Duke of Pomerania (1515–1560)
 Philip II of Spain, aka Philip I of Portugal (1527–1598)
 Philip I, Count of Schaumburg-Lippe (1601–1681)

See also
 Philippe I (disambiguation)

de:Liste der Herrscher namens Philipp#Philipp I.